Elizabeth (“Betsy”) Hawes is an American writer of biography, journalism and creative non-fiction.

Camus, A Romance
Her most recent book, Camus, A Romance, (Grove Press, 2009)  is a biography-memoir of the Nobel Prize–winning French-Algerian writer Albert Camus, in which she chronicles his life along with her own experience trying to follow in his footsteps.

Harper’s Magazine hails the book as “a beautiful memoir of a life-long obsession, a peek behind the curtains at the biographer’s art, and, not least, a rich and vivid portrait of Camus himself.”  The New Statesman judges that “as a measure of the man behind the work,” it is the “best bet so far.”

Other works

Hawes is also the author of New York, New York, How the Apartment House Transformed the Life of the City, 1869-1930 (Knopf, 1992), a narrative account of the golden age of the New York luxury apartment house that reveals how New York was transformed architecturally, socially, and psychologically from a provincial place into a great metropolis.   The New Yorker called it “an astute and enchanting story of urbanization,” Michiko Kakutani of The New York Times, “fascinating,,,Ms Hawes lends the story of the New York apartment house all the drama of a novel.”

A former staff member at The New Yorker, Hawes has contributed Talk of the Town and Reporter pieces to that magazine, and essays and reviews to The New York Times Magazine and Book Review, The Nation and numerous other publications.  She also wrote  Martha Stewart’s best-selling books Entertaining and Weddings.

Personal

Hawes, who is also Betsy Weinstock, is married with three children and resides in New York City and Martha’s Vineyard.

References

External links 
 http://camusaromance.com
 http://elizabethhawes.com

Living people
American non-fiction writers
Year of birth missing (living people)
American women non-fiction writers
21st-century American women writers